The Depression and Bipolar Support Alliance (DBSA) Greater Houston is a 501(c)(3) non-profit organization located in Houston, Texas. DBSA provides free and confidential support groups for individuals living with, or family and friends affected by, depression or bipolar disorder. Each support group is led by a facilitator trained by the organization.  Select groups target specific populations including veterans, adolescents, and parents of adolescents, young adults, senior citizens, LGBT Community, homeless individuals and Spanish-speaking individuals.

History
Established in 1979, the Depressive and Manic Disorder Association (DMDA) of Greater Houston sponsored up to five weekly support groups for those with depressive or manic depressive disorders.  In 2003, DMDA Greater Houston changed its name to DBSA Greater Houston and formed its own 501(c) (3) corporation. Currently, DBSA Greater Houston sponsors nearly 70 weekly support groups at 50 different locations throughout the Houston metropolitan area.  The Houston organization is the largest of the nation’s DBSA chapters, serving over 1,000 support group participants annually.

Affiliation
The Depression and Bipolar Support Alliance of Greater Houston is a chapter member of the National Depression and Bipolar Support Alliance organization based in Chicago, Illinois. Additionally, the organization has developed collaborations with a number of Houston area mental health and social service providers including the Texas Department of Corrections, the Harris County judicial system, the Michael DeBakey VA Hospital, Mental Health of America, National Alliance on Mental Illness and the AIDS Foundation of Houston.  Every group provided by DBSA Greater Houston is a collaboration with another organization in the community.  For a list of collaborations, visit the organizations website.

Statistics
DBSA Greater Houston utilizes 75 trained volunteer and professional facilitators to provide nearly 70 weekly support groups. According to an independently conducted demographics study in 2008, 64% of DBSA Greater Houston participants were female, 36% were male; 77% were diagnosed individuals while 23% were family members; 66% reported a diagnosis and/or symptoms of depression, 69% were diagnosed with bipolar disorder; 88% were prescribed psychotropic medications and 65% were in professional therapy.

The Depression and Bipolar Support Alliance of Greater Houston conducts an annual satisfaction survey for participants.  In 2013, the results continued to show a high rating of satisfaction with a score of 4.28 out of a possible 5, which represents excellence.  Also, it was found that the longer a person attends group, the more satisfied they are with the experience and the more skills they learn to manage their disorder. 

In 2006 DBSA Greater received the Chapter of the Year award from the national Depression and Bipolar Support Alliance.

Recent developments
On September 24, 2013, the Depression and Bipolar Support Alliance of Greater Houston hosted its second annual Help, Hope, and Healing Luncheon with speakers Jessie Close and actress, Glenn Close.  Jessie lives with Bipolar Disorder and Glenn talked about the perspective of the family and gave 2 monologues. 

The Depression and Bipolar Support Alliance of Greater Houston hosted its first annual Help, Hope, and Healing luncheon at the River Oaks Country Club on September 24, 2012 featuring Jane Pauley as the speaker.  Jane Pauley is known for her work on Dateline NBC and the Today Show.  Ms. Pauley lives with Bipolar Disorder.  

In the fall of 2008, DBSA Greater Houston published an outcome study independently conducted by Dr. Ralph Culler, former Associate Dean of Research at the Hogg Foundation for Mental Health.  The outcome study was designed to analyze the effectiveness of the DBSA Greater Houston support group model.  The study provided tools for DBSA Greater Houston to (1) provide quantitative and qualitative evidence that its support group model is effective (2) prove DBSA Greater Houston’s accountability to individuals utilizing its services and; (3) learn how the benefits of DBSA occur.

This study provided evidenced-based results that the DBSA Greater Houston support group model was effective in a number of areas.  The study used an outcome questionnaire which asked a broad range of questions regarding demographics, medical data, outcome assessments and satisfaction with the support group experience. On average 89% of group participants experienced an improvement in their quality of life as a direct benefit of their participation in the DBSA groups.  93% of participants reported high or very high satisfaction with their DBSA support group experience.

References

External links
DBSA-Houston Website
National Organization Website

Mental health organizations in Texas
Bipolar disorder